Alejandro Díaz (5 July 1920 – 12 April 2004) was a Chilean athlete. He competed in the men's hammer throw at the 1956 Summer Olympics.

References

1920 births
2004 deaths
Athletes (track and field) at the 1955 Pan American Games
Athletes (track and field) at the 1956 Summer Olympics
Athletes (track and field) at the 1959 Pan American Games
Chilean male hammer throwers
Olympic athletes of Chile
Place of birth missing
Pan American Games competitors for Chile